(born 1 March 1954) is a Japanese volleyball player and Olympic champion.

She was a member of the Japanese winning team at the 1976 Olympic games.

References

1954 births
Living people
Olympic volleyball players of Japan
Volleyball players at the 1976 Summer Olympics
Olympic gold medalists for Japan
Japanese women's volleyball players
Olympic medalists in volleyball
Asian Games medalists in volleyball
Volleyball players at the 1974 Asian Games
Medalists at the 1976 Summer Olympics
Medalists at the 1974 Asian Games
Asian Games gold medalists for Japan
20th-century Japanese women